The Ticknor Hall is a dormitory for the Colorado College designed by Walter F. Douglas and finished in 1898. The dormitory was the second dormitory in the Colorado College built specifically for women. The building is located in downtown Colorado Springs, Colorado and is noted for its use of the Queen Anne architectural style.

The building was listed on the National Register of Historic Places in 2000.

See also 
 National Register of Historic Places listings in El Paso County, Colorado

References 

School buildings completed in 1898
1898 establishments in Colorado
National Register of Historic Places in Colorado Springs, Colorado
School buildings on the National Register of Historic Places in Colorado